Fangasm is a reality television show that screened on SyFy in 2013. The series followed seven people as they worked as interns for Stan Lee's Comikaze Expo (now known as the L.A. Comic Con), and included guests such as Stan Lee and George Takei.

References

External links
 

2010s American reality television series
2013 American television series debuts
Syfy original programming
2013 American television series endings